Bertin Ebwellé Ndingué (born 11 September 1962) is a retired professional footballer who represented Cameroon at the 1990 FIFA World Cup. He also took part in 1992 African Nations Cup. He played club football with Tonnerre Yaoundé, Persisam Putra Samarinda and Olympic Mvolyé.

He coached Tonnerre Yaoundé.

References

External links

1962 births
Living people
Footballers from Yaoundé
Association football fullbacks
Cameroonian footballers
Cameroon international footballers
Tonnerre Yaoundé players
Olympic Mvolyé players
1988 African Cup of Nations players
1990 FIFA World Cup players
1990 African Cup of Nations players
1992 African Cup of Nations players
1996 African Cup of Nations players
Africa Cup of Nations-winning players
Cameroonian football managers
Cameroonian expatriate footballers
Expatriate footballers in Indonesia
Cameroonian expatriate sportspeople in Indonesia